Distance is an EP released in 2007 by New Zealand hardcore/metalcore band Antagonist, now known as Antagonist A.D.

Track listing

Antagonist A.D. albums
2007 EPs